The Ofo language was a language spoken by the Mosopelea tribe until c. 1673 in what is now Ohio, along the Ohio River. The tribe moved down the Mississippi River to Mississippi, near the Natchez people, and then to Louisiana, settling near the Tunica.

In the 18th century, the Mosopelea were known under the names Oufé and Offogoula. On the basis of the presence of the phoneme /f/ in these names, it was once suspected that Ofo was a Muskogean language. However, anthropologist John R. Swanton discovered an aged female speaker of Ofo, Rosa Pierrette in 1908 while he was conducting fieldwork among the Tunica, he was then able to confirm that the language was Siouan and was similar to Biloxi. Pierrette had spoken Ofo as a child but Swanton says she told him that the rest of her tribe "had killed each other off" when she was 17.

Phonology
Ofo follows a process similar to Grassmann's Law, with  counting as an aspirated consonant:  'crane' +  'white' >  'white egret' and  'fire' + either  'to burn' or  'to breathe' >  'smoke'.

The inventory is as follows:

{| class="wikitable" style=text-align:center
|- 
! colspan=2| 
! Labial
! Dental
! Palatal
! Velar
! Glottal
|- 
! rowspan=2| Plosive
! tenuis
|   ||  ||  ||  ||
|- 
! aspirated
|   ||  ||  ||  ||
|- 
! rowspan=2| Fricative
! tenuis
|  ||  ||  ||  || 
|- 
! aspirated
|  ||  || || ||
|- 
! colspan=2 rowspan=2 | Sonorant
|  ||  ||  || ||
|- 
|  ||  || || ||
|- 
! colspan="2" | Nasal
|  ||  || || ||
|}

Vowels

All vowels, including , may bear stress.

Morphology
Ofo is considered to be a mildly-polysynthetic language.

Possession
Ofo distinguishes between alienable and inalienable possession by the use of a prefix for first-, second-, and third-person singular as well as first-person dual. That can be abbreviated to 1sg, 2sg, 3sg, and 1du, respectively. The alienable possessions include the following: 1sg {ba-, aba-}, 2sg {č-, ača-}, 3sg {}, 1du {ã-}. The inalienable possessions include the following: 1sg {mi-}, 2sg {čĩ-}, 3sg {ĩ-}, 1du {ã-}.

Negation
Ofo uses the enclitic suffix -ni, to demonstrate negation. That enclitic is usually after the predicate.

Pluralization
Ofo uses the enclitic suffix -tu to pluralize the subject, the object, or both.

Instrumental prefixes
Instrumental prefixes describe the manner in which an action is carried out. Some instrumental prefixes are below:

atə- 'by extreme temperature'
tu-, du- 'by pulling/hand'
ta- 'by mouth'
pa- 'by pushing'
la- 'by foot'
ka- 'by striking'
pú- 'by pressure'
po- 'by blowing/shooting'

Person

Gender
Ofo appears to have no grammatical gender.

Space, time, and modality
Irrealis mood consists of the suffix -abe. It is the equivalent to the future in English:

óktat-,abe, 'he will kill you'
tcóktat-abĕ, 'you will work'
atcikthé-be, 'I will kill you'

Continuative aspect is formed using the word nóñki.

Iterative aspect is created by reduplication:

è-te-te, 'sick, keep on suffering'
šni-šni-we, 'itch, keep on itching'
tó-fku-fku-pi, 'wink, blink, keep on winking or blinking'

Syntax
The documentation of Ofo does not provide enough information to develop a complete syntax of the language. However, structures also found in related languages have been found.

Ofo appears to have a head-dependent ordering in sentences, which gives it an object-verb word order. The order of verbs may be described as being clause-final. Many cases appear to support that. An example can be seen below:

Case
Only some forms are known because of a lack of documentation.

Dative case appears in Ofo and can be interpreted as resembling an accusative pronoun in English.

Complements and causatives
There is no information in the Ofo data to support Ofo having explicit complement clauses. However, it is apparent that embedded clauses precede the main clause.

The causative is marked by the enclitic -we.

Sources

 Holmer, Nils, M., An Ofo Phonetic Law, International Journal of American Linguistics, 13:1, 1947.
 Moseley, Christopher and R. E. Asher, ed. Atlas of the Worlds Languages (New York:Routelege, 1994) Map 5
 Dorsey, J. Owen, and John R. Swanton. 1912. "A Dictionary of the Biloxi and Ofo Languages". Bureau of American
Ethnology Bulletin 47. Washington, D. C.: Government Printing Office.
 Swanton, John R. c.1908 [Ofo-English dictionary], Typed and Autographed Document, 613 cards. National
Anthropological Archives, 2455-OFO, Smithsonian Institution, Washington, DC.
 Swanton, John R. 1909. A New Siouan Dialect. "Putnam Anniversary Volume: Anthropological Essays Presented to Prederic Ward Putnam in Honor of His Seventieth Birthday", pp. 477–86. New York: G. E. Stechert.

References

External links
 Ofo on Native Languages

Extinct languages of North America
Western Siouan languages
Languages of the United States
Languages extinct in the 1990s